Baba Bilal ogly Aydamirov, also known as Mashadibaba, (February 13, 1971, in Mastaga, Baku, Azerbaijani SSR, USSR – January 10, 2011, in Mashtaga, Baku, Azerbaijan) was a  performer of Azerbaijani meykhana music and poet.

Biography
Mashadibaba started to perform meykhana in 1984, in his early teens. Before performing, Mashadibaba wrote poems and songs, and later took to meykhana due to the financial difficulties. In the early 1990s he rose to prominence with his friend Elchin, who was also a distinguished performer. Rumors have it that Mashadibaba was consuming a huge amount of alcohol at the time. He served six years in prison for killing Elchin Mashtaghaly. As a result, a drinking spree-related nervous breakdown brought the performer to depression. By this time Mashadibaba had been suffering from long-time alcoholism. Because of his ensuing health problems and after divorcing his wife, Mashadibaba underwent another nervous breakdown. His performing abilities also deteriorated, and he committed suicide by self-immolation on 10 January 2011.

References

1971 births
2011 suicides
21st-century Azerbaijani male singers
20th-century Azerbaijani male singers
Meykhana musicians
Suicides by self-immolation
Suicides in Azerbaijan